The Folgore class were a group of four destroyers built for the  (Royal Italian Navy) in the 1930s. None of the ships survived World War II.

Design and description
The Folgore-class destroyers were extremely similar to the preceding , although their beam was reduced in an unsuccessful attempt to improve their speed over that achieved by the earlier ships. Their complement during wartime was 185 officers and enlisted men.

The Folgores were powered by two Belluzzo geared steam turbines, each driving one propeller shaft using steam supplied by three Thornycroft boilers.

Their main battery consisted of four 50-caliber Cannone da /50 A Modello 1926 guns in two twin-gun turrets, one each fore and aft of the superstructure. Anti-aircraft (AA) defense for the Folgore-class ships was provided by a pair of 39-caliber Cannone da /39 AA guns in single mounts amidships and a pair of twin-gun mounts for Breda  Modello 1931 machine guns. They were equipped with six  torpedo tubes in two triple mounts amidships. Although the ships were not provided with a sonar system for anti-submarine work, they were fitted with a pair of depth charge throwers. The Folgores could carry 52 mines.

Ships

Built by CNQ Fiume, completed 15 June 1932.
On 14 June 1940 she sank the submarine  in the Gulf of Taranto.
Only 37 of her crew survived, among the killed there was the commanding officer, Lt. Cdr. Giuseppe Arnaud.

Built by OC Partenopei, Naples, completed 1 July 1932.
She was sunk on 2 December 1942 by British cruisers of Force Q during the Battle of Skerki Bank, while trying to protect the convoy she was escorting. 124 men, including the commanding officer Lt. Cdr. Ener Bettica, went down with the ship.

Built by CNQ Fiume, completed 14 September 1932.
She was sunk on 9 November 1941 by British surface ships of Force K during the Battle of the Duisburg Convoy. 141 men were lost, among them the CO Lt. Cdr. Mario Milano.
 
Built by OC Partenopei, Naples, completed 13 August 1932.
Disabled by British destroyers on 16 April 1941 during the Battle of the Tarigo Convoy, she ran aground with 141 of her 205 crew killed in action, but she was later salvaged and put back into service. She was sunk by bombers on 30 April 1943 off Cape Bon, while carrying ammunition to Tunisia, with the loss of 60 out of 213 crewmen.

Turkish Ships

Four similar ships were built in Italy for the Turkish Navy:

 The s were similar to the Italian ships but fitted with two funnels. These ships were built by Cantiere navale di Riva Trigoso.
 The s were altered to have four single guns rather than two twin guns and were lengthened to compensate. These ships were built by Ansaldo in Genoa.

Notes

Bibliography

External links
 Folgore-class destroyer Marina Militare website

 
Destroyer classes
Destroyers of the Regia Marina